Kaharlyk Raion was a raion (district) in Kyiv Oblast of Ukraine. Its administrative center was the city of Kaharlyk. The raion was abolished on 18 July 2020 as part of the administrative reform of Ukraine, which reduced the number of raions in Kyiv Oblast to seven. The area of Kaharlyk Raion was merged into Obukhiv Raion.

At the time of disestablishment, the raion consisted of one hromada, Kaharlyk urban hromada with the administration in Kaharlyk.

References

Former raions of Kyiv Oblast
1986 establishments in Ukraine
Ukrainian raions abolished during the 2020 administrative reform